Chinna rasalu or Chinnarasamulu is an Indian mango variety originating in Nuzvid, Andhra Pradesh, India.  It is a particularly juicy variety and it is grown across Andhra Pradesh and Telangana in Southern India.

References

Mango cultivars of India